Aotea College is a state co-educational secondary school located in Porirua, New Zealand. Founded in 1978, the school serves students for Year 9 to 13 (ages 12 to 18) across the northern suburbs of Porirua.

Demographics
At the September 2013 Education Review Office (ERO) review, Aotea College had 936 students enrolled, including seven international students. Forty-seven percent of students were male and 53 percent were female. Thirty-seven percent of students identified as New Zealand European (Pākehā), 28 percent identified as Māori, 26 percent as Pacific Islanders, seven percent as Asian, and two percent as another ethnicity.

Aotea College has a socio-economic decile of 5 (step M), meaning it draws its school community from areas of moderate socioeconomic status when compared to other New Zealand schools.

Redevelopment 
 
In late 2015, it was announced that Aotea College would receive $24 million from the New Zealand Ministry of Education to fund an upgrade of the school's ageing facilities. Work was scheduled to begin in early 2017, which would see the construction of new flexible learning spaces with high standards of heating and lighting. Such an upgrade was warranted after recent storms and decades of deterioration had led to an estimated half of the college's buildings becoming leaky. Furthermore, the Te Manawa building was closed in 2015 due to the presence of black mould.  These renovations were completed in late 2019 and the building was occupied from January 2020.

Sport and cultural activities 
Sport and cultural activities are a major part of Aotea College. Students are encouraged to take at least one winter sport and summer sport. Aotea College competes in the New Zealand National Secondary Schools Barbershop competition – in 2008, 2009, 2010, 2011, 2012, 2013, 2014, 2015, 2016, 2017 the girls' chorus won first place in both the regional and the national competition in Wellington.

Notable ex-students
Tania Tupu – New Zealand Tall Ferns (basketball)
Serge Lilo – Wellington Hurricanes and Lions representative (rugby)

References

External links
 Aotea College official website
 

Educational institutions established in 1978
Secondary schools in the Wellington Region
Schools in Porirua
1978 establishments in New Zealand
New Zealand secondary schools of S68 plan construction